Simon Rufus Isaacs, 4th Marquess of Reading (born 18 May 1942), is a British peer, banker and philanthropist.

Biography

Early life 
Simon Rufus Isaacs was born on 18 May 1942.

His father was Michael Isaacs, 3rd Marquess of Reading (1916–1980), and his mother was Margot Irene (née Duke) (1919–2015). His paternal grandfather was Gerald Isaacs, 2nd Marquess of Reading (1889–1960). His paternal great-grandfather was Rufus Isaacs, 1st Marquess of Reading (1860–1935). He became the fourth Marquess of Reading after his father's death in 1980. His maternal great-grandparents were Alfred Moritz Mond, 1st Baron Melchett (1868–1930), and Violet Mond, Baroness Melchett (1867–1945). Violet Mond's grandfather was Ludwig Mond (1839–1909), chemist and industrialist, who created the Mond process to extract and purify nickel.

Career
He was a lieutenant in 1st The Queen's Dragoon Guards from 1961 to 1964.

He worked as a stockbroker from 1964 to 1974, and he was a member of the London Stock Exchange from 1970 to 1974. From 1975 to 1980, he was marketing director of Brahmco International. He worked for Ralph Lauren Cosmetics from 1979 to 1983. He then worked for Abbey Lubbock and Abbey Sports and Events from 1984 to 1992.

He was a business partner of Prince Michael of Kent.

Philanthropy
Reading was Chairman of the Land's End John o' Groats Club from 1992 to 1996. He served as director of the Global Flying Hospitals from 1996 to 2000. From 1990 to 2000, he was president of the Dean Close School in Cheltenham, Gloucestershire. He has served on the Board of Directors of CURE International since 2004, and of the Mertens House in Saint Petersburg, Russia since 2008. He served as a member of the Council of the Garden Tomb in Jerusalem from 2002 to 2008.

He is a patron of the Nelson Recovery Trust and, since 1998, of the Barnabas Fund.

In 2003, he criticized the decision made by the vice-chancellor of the University of Sussex, Alasdair Smith, to sell Swanborough Manor in Iford, East Sussex, which was donated by his step-great-grandmother, Stella Isaacs, Marchioness of Reading (1894–1971), in the hope that it would serve as the main residence of the vice-chancellor until 2021.

In May 2022 Lord Reading was one of the Patrons of The Royal Versailles Ball, a charitable event which took place at the Palace of Versailles. Earlier that year, he was awarded the Order of Menelik II (Grand Cross) by the Crown Council of Ethiopia for his charitable work.

Personal life
Lord Reading married Melinda Dewar on 12 May 1979. They have three children:
Lady Sybilla Alice Rufus Isaacs (3 November 1980) she married Charles B. B. Hart on 9 July 2005. They have four children:
Lady Natasha Rufus Isaacs (24 April 1983) she married Charles Finch on 8 June 2013. They have three daughters.
Julian Rufus Isaacs, Viscount Erleigh (26 May 1986)

In May 2021 he announced his intention to seek Israeli citizenship.

References

External links
Margot Irene, Marchioness of Reading

1942 births
Living people
English Jews
English people of Portuguese-Jewish descent
English people of German-Jewish descent
People from Bisley, Gloucestershire
English bankers
English philanthropists
4
Reading
Recipients of orders, decorations, and medals of Ethiopia